Fábio Daniel Soares Silva (born 19 July 2002) is a Portuguese professional footballer who plays as a striker for Eredivisie club PSV Eindhoven, on loan from  club Wolverhampton Wanderers.

Silva made his professional debut for Porto in August 2019, and set several club records relating to his young age.

Club career

Early career
Born in Gondomar, Porto District, Silva began his career at FC Porto before transferring to rivals Benfica in 2015, then returning two years later. Silva was part of the squad that won the 2018–19 UEFA Youth League. With 20 goals in 26 games for the under-19 team by February 2019, he was called up by manager Sérgio Conceição to train with the first team.

Porto 
He made his Primeira Liga debut for Porto on 10 August 2019 in a 2–1 loss at Gil Vicente, playing the final 11 minutes in place of Otávio; at 17 years and 22 days, he surpassed Bruno Gama as the youngest league player in the club's history. On 19 September against Young Boys in the UEFA Europa League group stage, he became the club's youngest player in European competitions, beating Rúben Neves. Six days later, he became the club's youngest starter in any competition when he lined up against Santa Clara in the Taça da Liga group stage, beating a record held by Serafim Pereira since 1960.

On 19 October, Silva scored his first goal to conclude a 5–0 win at neighbouring Coimbrões in the third round of the Taça de Portugal; with this goal he surpassed Neves as the youngest goalscorer in the club's history, by a month. Eight days later, he beat the same player's record as Porto's youngest league goalscorer in a 3–0 home win over Famalicão. On 10 November, in a 1–0 win at Boavista in the Derby da Invicta, he became the youngest starter in the club's history, a record held since Serafim's days.

On 9 February 2020, Silva dropped into Porto's reserve team in LigaPro, debuting as a starter in a 1–1 home draw with Farense, as one of three appearances at this level. He made two further appearances for Porto's first team following the resumption of the league after the coronavirus-enforced shutdown as the club won the league title.

Wolverhampton Wanderers
On 5 September 2020, Silva moved to English Premier League club Wolverhampton Wanderers in a five-year deal for a club record fee of a reported £35 million. He made his full club debut on 17 September 2020 in an EFL Cup defeat to Stoke City; four days later he made his Premier League debut as a second-half substitute in a 3–1 home loss to Manchester City.

Silva scored his first two goals in a Wolves shirt for the under-21 team in a 2–1 away win over Doncaster Rovers in the EFL Trophy on 10 November 2020. His first league start was in a 1–0 home defeat against Aston Villa on 12 December, and eight days later he scored his first league goal through a penalty in a 2–1 away loss against Burnley. In doing so, Silva became Wolves' youngest ever Premier League goalscorer.

On 16 January 2021, Silva scored his first goal from open play and his first goal at Molineux for Wolves against West Bromwich Albion in the first Black Country derby of the 2020–21 season. After scoring his fourth goal of the 2020–21 Premier League season against West Bromwich Albion at The Hawthorns on 3 May, he became the second-highest scoring Portuguese teenager in Premier League history, with only Cristiano Ronaldo (eight goals) having scored more in the competition before turning 20.

Silva made his first start for Wolves in the 2021–22 Premier League season in a 2–1 away win over Brentford on 22 January 2022, due to Raúl Jiménez missing the game through injury.

Loan to Anderlecht
On 19 July 2022, Silva joined Belgian club Anderlecht on a season-long loan, as well as signing a contract extension with Wolves. On 24 July 2022, Silva scored on his league debut against Oostende after coming off the bench in a 2-0 win.

Loan to PSV Eindhoven
On 25 January 2023, the agreement with Anderlecht was terminated and Silva was loaned out to Eredivisie side PSV Eindhoven until the end of the season.

International career
Silva had his first international experience with Portugal's under-15 team in 2017. He was part of the under-17 team that reached the quarter-finals of the 2019 UEFA European Championship in the Republic of Ireland, scoring in a 4–2 group win over Iceland.

On 11 October 2019, Silva scored a hat-trick for the under-19s in a 4–1 friendly win over Italy in Bragança.

Personal life
Silva's father Jorge was a defensive midfielder who won the league in 2001 for Boavista and was capped twice by Portugal, and his older brother also named Jorge played that position for Lazio.

Career statistics

Honours
Porto Youth
UEFA Youth League: 2018–19

Porto
Primeira Liga: 2019–20
Taça de Portugal: 2019–20

References

External links

Fábio Silva  at TBPlayers.com

2002 births
Living people
People from Gondomar, Portugal
Sportspeople from Porto District
Portuguese footballers
Association football forwards
Primeira Liga players
Liga Portugal 2 players
Premier League players
Eredivisie players
FC Porto players
FC Porto B players
Wolverhampton Wanderers F.C. players
R.S.C. Anderlecht players
PSV Eindhoven players
Portugal youth international footballers
Portuguese expatriate footballers
Portuguese expatriate sportspeople in England
Portuguese expatriate sportspeople in Belgium
Portuguese expatriate sportspeople in the Netherlands
Expatriate footballers in England
Expatriate footballers in Belgium
Expatriate footballers in the Netherlands